Nymphargus cochranae (common name: Cochran frog) is a species of frog in the family Centrolenidae. It is found in the lower Amazonian slopes of the Cordillera Occidental of Ecuador and adjacent Colombia, though the Colombian records require confirmation.

Etymology
The specific name cochranae honours Doris Mable Cochran, an American herpetologist.

Habitat and conservation
Its natural habitats are montane rainforest along streams with steep gradients. It is threatened by habitat destruction and degradation.

References

cochranae
Amphibians of Colombia
Amphibians of Ecuador
Taxonomy articles created by Polbot
Amphibians described in 1961